The 1959 Washington Senators won 63 games, lost 91, and finished in eighth place in the American League, 31 games behind the AL Champion Chicago White Sox in their penultimate season in The Nation's Capital. They were managed by Cookie Lavagetto and played home games at Griffith Stadium.

Regular season 
On September 7, Ron Samford hit a home run in the last at bat of his career.

Pedro Ramos led the American League in losses.

Season standings

Record vs. opponents

Notable transactions 
 April 1, 1959: Vito Valentinetti was traded by the Senators to the Baltimore Orioles for Billy Loes. The trade was voided and the players returned to their original teams on April 8.
 July 25, 1959: Jay Porter was selected off waivers from the Senators by the St. Louis Cardinals.

Roster

Player stats

Batting

Starters by position 
Note: Pos = Position; G = Games played; AB = At bats; H = Hits; Avg. = Batting average; HR = Home runs; RBI = Runs batted in

Other batters 
Note: G = Games played; AB = At bats; H = Hits; Avg. = Batting average; HR = Home runs; RBI = Runs batted in

Pitching

Starting pitchers 
Note: G = Games pitched; IP = Innings pitched; W = Wins; L = Losses; ERA = Earned run average; SO = Strikeouts

Other pitchers 
Note: G = Games pitched; IP = Innings pitched; W = Wins; L = Losses; ERA = Earned run average; SO = Strikeouts

Relief pitchers 
Note: G = Games pitched; W = Wins; L = Losses; SV = Saves; ERA = Earned run average; SO = Strikeouts

Farm system

Notes

References 
1959 Washington Senators at Baseball-Reference
1959 Washington Senators team page at www.baseball-almanac.com

Minnesota Twins seasons
Washington Senators season
1959 in sports in Washington, D.C.